Les Sanguinaires is a 1997 French television film directed by Laurent Cantet for the 2000, Seen By... project.

Plot
With the hype of celebrations for the turn of the millennium becoming burdensome, a group of friends attempt to avoid the chaos by leaving for a nearly uninhabited island.

Cast
Frédéric Pierrot as Francois
Jalil Lespert as Stéphane

Production
The French company Haut et Court's producers Caroline Benjo and Carole Scotta initiated 2000, Seen By..., to produce films depicting the approaching turn of the millennium seen from the perspectives of 10 different countries.  Benjo chose Cantet for France's contribution to the project because of his short films.

Release
The film played on the French-German TV station Arte in November 1998 and was screened at the Venice Film Festival, but was never generally released in theatres.

References

External links
Les Sanguinaires at the Internet Movie Database
Les Sanguinaires at Haut et Court 

1997 television films
1997 films
Films directed by Laurent Cantet
1990s French-language films
French television films
1990s French films